Bolâhenk Nuri Bey (b. in Istanbul, Ottoman Empire in 1834 - d. Istanbul, 1910) was a Turkish Ottoman composer. Nuri Bey's compositions serve as grand examples of the classical styles.

Nuri Bey took lessons from Hadice Hanım, daughter of Dede Efendi. He apprenticed with Rıza Efendi, sheikh of the Eyüp Hatuniye Lodge, and learned hundreds of ilahis and verses from him. Among Nuri Bey's notable students are Hacı Kirâmi Efendi and neyzen Emin Dede.

"Bolâhenk" is a nickname that means "many harmonies" and "Bey" is a title, like "sir." There were no surnames at the time.

See also 
 List of composers of classical Turkish music

References

1834 births
1910 deaths
Composers of Ottoman classical music
Composers of Turkish makam music
Musicians from Istanbul